Around the World in 80 Days is a three-part television miniseries originally broadcast on NBC from April 16 to 18, 1989. The production garnered three nominations for Emmy awards that year.  The teleplay by John Gay is based on the 1873 Jules Verne novel of the same title.

Plot
The plot centres around Phileas Fogg (Pierce Brosnan) making a £20,000 wager with three members of the Reform Club that he can circumnavigate the world in 80 days. He takes with him his newly employed French valet Passepartout (Eric Idle), and is pursued by Detective Wilbur Fix (Peter Ustinov) who mistakenly thinks Fogg robbed the Bank of England and is using the wager as a cover to escape capture.

Cast

 Pierce Brosnan as Phileas Fogg
 Eric Idle as Jean Passepartout
 Julia Nickson as Princess Aouda
 Peter Ustinov as Detective Wilbur Fix
 Jack Klugman as Capt. Bunsby
 Roddy McDowall as McBaines
 Darren McGavin as Benjamin Mudge
 Robert Morley as Wentworth
 Stephen Nichols as Jesse James
 Lee Remick as Sarah Bernhardt
 Jill St. John as Woman mistaken for Princess Aouda
 Robert Wagner as Alfred Bennett
 Arielle Dombasle as Lucette
 Gabriele Ferzetti as Italian Chief of Police
 Henry Gibson as Train Conductor
 John Hillerman as Sir Francis Commarty
 Rick Jason as Cornelius Vanderbilt
 Christopher Lee as Stuart
 Patrick Macnee as Ralph Gautier
 John Mills as Faversham
 Pernell Roberts as Captain Speedy
 Cassie Stuart as Madelaine
 James Sikking as Jenks
 Simon Ward as Flannigan
 John Abineri as Father Gruber
 Yves Aubert as Gravier
 Bill Bailey as Captain Phillips
 Peter Birrel as Brindisi Terminal Clerk
 John Carlin as Forster
 Jean-Pierre Castaldi as Lenoir
 Lane Cooper as Kyaukese
 Julian Curry as Wilson
 Ellis Dale as Bank Clerk
 Bruce Troy Davis as Captain Lacey
 Edward Dentith as Faversham's Aide
 Hugo De Vernier as Louis Pasteur
 Gérard Dimiglio as Bonheur First Officer
 Roy Evans as 'Shirley Rose' Engineer
 Don Ferguson as Bombay Director of Police
 Henry Fong as Tung Chih
 Michael Gable as Frank James
 Maurice Gardette as French Consul
 Arne Gordon as Bank Guard
 Olivier Hémon as Georges
 Colin Higgins as Reporter
 Mark Holmes as Major Bryce
 George Ip as Tailor
 Subhash Joshi as Indian Gentleman
 Abraham Lee as Carnatic Steamship Clerk
 Michael Lee as Sinji Servant
 Lily Leung as Empress
 Joseph Long as Italian Squad Leader
 Victor Maddern as Liverpool Ticket Agent
 Anna Massey as Queen Victoria
 Ian McNeice as Batcular
 Ajay Mehta as Calcutta Harbor Clerk
 Christopher Muncke as Vanderbilt First Officer
 Pierre Olaf as Captain Rondicherry
 Sai-Kit Yung as Bayfront Hotel Clerk
 Arun Pathela as Kiru
 John Rapley as Reverend Samuel Smythe
 Terrence Scammell as Grimes
 Peter Sharman as English Consul Clerk
 Eve Schickle as The Harlot
 Tommy Tam as Chinese Dockworker
 Theodore Thomas as Police Chief
 Violetta as Mildred
 Ed Wiley as Ffolkestone
 Tariq Yunus as Prince Bayinnaung
 Victor Langley as Minister (uncredited)

Development
Starring Pierce Brosnan as Phileas Fogg, Eric Idle as Passepartout, Julia Nickson as Princess Aouda, and Peter Ustinov as Detective Fix, the miniseries featured multiple cameo appearances, including Patrick Macnee, Simon Ward, and Christopher Lee as members of the Reform Club, and Robert Morley, who had a cameo in the 1956 film adaptation, and Roddy McDowall appear as officials of the Bank of England. Other familiar faces, credited as guest stars and in more substantial roles, include John Mills (who also appeared in the 1956 film version), Jack Klugman, Darren McGavin, John Hillerman and Henry Gibson.

The heroes travel a slightly different route than in the book, and the script makes several contemporary celebrities part of the story who were not mentioned in the book, such as Sarah Bernhardt, Louis Pasteur, Jesse James, Cornelius Vanderbilt, Empress Dowager Cixi, and Queen Victoria.

The miniseries was filmed on location in England, Macau, Hong Kong, Thailand and Yugoslavia.

Viewership

References

External links
 
 
 

1989 television films
1989 films
1980s American television miniseries
Television shows based on Around the World in Eighty Days
NBC network original films
Television series set in the 1870s
Films shot in London
Films shot in Hong Kong
Films shot in Macau
Films shot in Thailand
Cultural depictions of Queen Victoria on film
Cultural depictions of Sarah Bernhardt
Cultural depictions of Louis Pasteur
Cultural depictions of Jesse James
Films with screenplays by John Gay (screenwriter)
Television shows set in the British Raj
Television shows set in India
Television shows set in Mumbai
Television shows set in Kolkata
Cultural depictions of Indian women